Earl Anderson Bamber (born 9 July 1990) is a professional racing driver from New Zealand, currently competing as a factory driver for Porsche Motorsport in the WeatherTech SportsCar Championship GTLM class.

He is the 2014 Porsche Supercup and double Porsche Carrera Cup Asia champion. He has also won the 24 Hours of Le Mans twice, having won in 2015 with Nico Hülkenberg and Nick Tandy and 2017 with Timo Bernhard and Brendon Hartley. The latter trio was also joint winner of the 2017 FIA World Endurance Championship for Drivers.

Early life
Earl Bamber was born in Whanganui, New Zealand, to Paul and Maureen Bamber (née Johnson), and lived on a farm where he learned to drive in the small settlement of Jerusalem on the Whanganui River. He attended Wanganui Collegiate School along with his younger brother, William. Bamber began in kart racing and won his first title aged 12, at the North Island Sprint Championships (Junior 100cc Yamaha Restricted), and his first national title at the 2004 Sprint Kart Championship meeting in Auckland. Later that year, he secured a podium at the Rotax Max category's annual Grand Final in Portugal after dominating the Junior class in the 2004 Rotax Max Challenge of New Zealand.

Racing career

Open-wheel racing

Bamber progressed through karts and single seater series and was ranked sixth highest future star in the world by the internationally recognised website driverdb.com in 2008. At 15 he switched to the New Zealand Formula Ford Championship before competing in Asia two years later where he won the Asian Formula BMW title. He achieved pole positions, fastest laps and podium results in Formula Renault V6 and Australian Formula 3, despite a tight budget. In 2008 he won two vice-championship trophies – in Formula Renault V6 Asia and Toyota Racing Series New Zealand. Bamber contested several rounds of the international A1 Grand Prix series for the New Zealand team in 2009, finishing on the podium three times. He also stood on the podium in GP2 Asia, at the age of 19. In 2010 he repeated his 2008 success and was again crowned runner-up in the New Zealand Toyota Racing Series.

Sportscar racing

2013
In 2013, Bamber made his first appearance in Porsche's one make series in the Porsche Carrera Cup Asia with Malaysian team, Nexus Racing. He battled all season with Martin Ragginger but eventually won the drivers championship. Bamber was also successful in endurance racing, winning the Bathurst 12 Hour (Class B) with Grove Racing, alongside team owner and Carrera Cup Australia regular Stephen Grove and eventual Supercup rival Ben Barker. He was subsequently selected to race in three Porsche Supercup meetings. Bamber's inaugural sportscar racing season ended with victory in the Carrera Cup Asia race at the 60th Macau Grand Prix meeting, defeating nine-time World Rally Champion Sébastien Loeb in the process.

Porsche Carrera Cup Asia nominated Bamber for the Porsche Motorsport International Cup Scholarship shootout in Oschersleben, Germany, where he beat seven other top pilots from Porsche one-make cups series around the world. Part of the selection process included the simulation of a qualifying session as well as an entire race. He received funding of 200,000 Euros for his 2014 Porsche Supercup season campaign the following season.

2014

Bamber raced with FACH Auto Tech in the Porsche Supercup alongside Porsche Carrera Cups of Germany and Asia with Team 75 Bernhard and LKM Racing, respectively.  After ten rounds in the Supercup, Bamber won the drivers championship with 155 points, ahead of Kuba Giermaziak on 132 points, becoming the first New Zealander to win the Porsche Supercup title and the first rookie to do so. After seven of the ten races, the FACH Auto Tech driver had already won the rookie classification. He dominated the Porsche Carrera Cup Asia season on his way to retaining the title as he won eight out of the ten races that he competed in despite missing two races in Zhuhai due to his concurrent commitments in Porsche Supercup and Porsche Carrera Cup Germany. With the support of Team 75 Bernhard, Bamber competed in ten out of eighteen rounds of the Porsche Carrera Cup Germany with two wins, five podiums and three fastest laps. He left the series holding second position in the Drivers Championship and was seventh overall at the end of the season. Bamber also replaced the injured Richard Lietz in the Porsche 911 RSR at the Petit Le Mans in the United SportsCar Championship, joining Porsche works drivers Patrick Long and Michael Christensen. Their second place ensured team Porsche North America, run by Core Autosport, won the manufacturers title in the championship.

2015

Prior to the 2015 season, Bamber signed with Porsche Motorsport as a works driver. In January 2015, he and fellow works drivers Jörg Bergmeister and Frédéric Makowiecki took the No.912 Porsche 911 RSR to seventh place at the 24 Hours of Daytona. Bamber and Nick Tandy joined Formula One driver Nico Hülkenberg in the Porsche LMP squad to contest the 6 Hours of Spa-Francorchamps and the Le Mans 24 Hours in a 919 Hybrid. Bamber's hybrid, car No. 19, was third on the grid after Porsche finished first, second and third in qualifying, but ended up winning comfortably. Bamber's childhood friend and Porsche teammate, Brendon Hartley, with co-drivers Mark Webber and Timo Bernhard, started from second on the grid in a 919 Hybrid and finished the race in second place. Bamber claimed his first career GT Le Mans (GTLM) pole at the Continental Tire Road Race Showcase at Road America in his first qualifying attempt as a Porsche factory driver on  August 8. He bettered the previous lap record by more than a full second. He also made a guest appearance in the FIA World Endurance Championship's 6 Hours of Nürburgring, filling in for Klaus Bachler in the No. 88 Abu Dhabi-Proton Racing Porsche 911 RSR. Bamber made his debut in the FIA GT World Cup in the streets of Macau in November. The versatility in going between LMP1, GTE-Pro (GT Le Mans in IMSA) and GTE-Am this year, he said, made him a better driver.

2016

In 2016, Bamber continues to pilot the 911 RSR for Porsche North America and Porsche Motorsport in the IMSA WeatherTech Sportscar Championship and the 24 Hours of Le Mans in the World Endurance Championship, respectively.
Bamber was the highest placed Kiwi driver at the 54th running of the Rolex 24 Hours of Daytona when his Porsche 911 RSR team came home third in the GTLM class and placed ninth overall. Bamber made a successful return at the Bathurst 12 Hour with a 2nd Class B victory for Grove Motorsport in as many races at the endurance classic in Mount Panorama, Australia alongside team owner Stephen Grove and V8 Supercars driver Scott McLaughlin. In changing weather conditions at the 12 Hours of Sebring, Bamber and his teammates in the #912 Porsche 911 RSR finished 3rd.

2017

On 3 December 2016, Bamber was confirmed as a member of the Porsche LMP1 team with Nick Tandy and André Lotterer to contest 2017 FIA World Endurance Championship. He co-drove the #2 car with Timo Bernhard and Brendon Hartley, replacing the retired Mark Webber.

Other racing
In August 2020, Bamber joined NASCAR team Richard Childress Racing for the Xfinity Series race on the Daytona road course. Bamber had become associated with team owner Richard Childress via his father, who was hunting partners with Childress in the 2000s; Bamber and RCR attempted to work a three-race deal after Bamber participated in oval racing with RCR driver Ty Dillon, but it failed to materialise. Bamber started 29th in the UNOH 188 but finished 33rd after hitting a kerb on the backstretch chicane, which caused his car to go airborne.

Hypercar career
For the 2023 season, Bamber would join Alex Lynn and Richard Westbrook in the Hypercar category of the World Endurance Championship, piloting a Cadillac V-Series.R ran by Chip Ganassi Racing.

Helmets
Bamber uses helmets designed by Italian manufacturers Stilo. He acknowledges his home country with a silver fern design on the sides of his Stilo ST5 helmets, a quasi-national emblem used for various official symbols, including the Coat of arms of New Zealand and the New Zealand one dollar coin. On top are four red stars with white borders representing the Southern Cross which features on the Flag of New Zealand. He has the number 19 painted on the back of one of his helmets, the same number as on his Porsche 919 Hybrid.

Motorsports career results

Career results

Complete A1 Grand Prix results
(key) (Races in bold indicate pole position) (Races in italics indicate fastest lap)

Complete GP2 Asia Series results 
(key) (Races in bold indicate pole position) (Races in italics indicate fastest lap)

Complete Porsche Carrera Cup Asia results
(key) (Races in bold indicate pole position) (Races in italics indicate fastest lap)

Complete Porsche Carrera Cup Germany results
(key) (Races in bold indicate pole position) (Races in italics indicate fastest lap)

Complete Porsche Supercup results
(key) (Races in bold indicate pole position) (Races in italics indicate fastest lap)

Complete Bathurst 12 Hour results

Complete 24 Hours of Le Mans results

Complete FIA World Endurance Championship results

Complete IMSA SportsCar Championship results
(key) (Races in bold indicate pole position) (Races in italics indicate fastest lap)

* Season still in progress.

Supercars Championship results

Bathurst 1000 results

NASCAR
(key) (Bold – Pole position awarded by qualifying time. Italics – Pole position earned by points standings or practice time. * – Most laps led.)

Xfinity Series

 Ineligible for series points.

References

External links

 
 
 
 
 Earl Bamber's Official Porsche Profile

1990 births
Living people
Sportspeople from Whanganui
New Zealand racing drivers
24 Hours of Le Mans drivers
24 Hours of Le Mans winning drivers
Formula Ford drivers
Formula BMW Asia drivers
Formula V6 Asia drivers
Toyota Racing Series drivers
Australian Formula 3 Championship drivers
International Formula Master drivers
A1 Team New Zealand drivers
GP2 Asia Series drivers
Auto GP drivers
Porsche Supercup drivers
24 Hours of Daytona drivers
WeatherTech SportsCar Championship drivers
FIA World Endurance Championship drivers
People educated at Whanganui Collegiate School
NASCAR drivers
A1 Grand Prix drivers
Porsche Motorsports drivers
Nürburgring 24 Hours drivers
Superleague Formula drivers
Supercars Championship drivers
Team Meritus drivers
Super Nova Racing drivers
M2 Competition drivers
Rowe Racing drivers
KCMG drivers
International GT Open drivers
Chip Ganassi Racing drivers
Sports car racing team owners
Richard Childress Racing drivers
ART Grand Prix drivers
24H Series drivers
Craft-Bamboo Racing drivers
Porsche Carrera Cup Germany drivers